Pandy railway station was a railway station which served the Monmouthshire village of Pandy.  It was located on the Welsh Marches Line between Hereford and Abergavenny.

The station, comprising a booking office, a cloakroom and the station-master's house, was destroyed by fire in 1904.

The station closed in 1958.

The Owen Sheers novel Resistance used Pandy railway station as a location.

References

Further reading

Disused railway stations in Monmouthshire
Former Great Western Railway stations
Railway stations in Great Britain closed in 1854
Railway stations in Great Britain closed in 1958